Cade Otton (born April 15, 1999) is an American football tight end for the Tampa Bay Buccaneers of the National Football League (NFL). He previously played college football at Washington before being selected by the Buccaneers in the fourth round of the 2022 NFL Draft.

High school career
Otton attended Tumwater High School in Tumwater, Washington. As a senior he was The Olympian’s All-Area Football Player of the Year after recording 39 receptions for 733 yards with 13 touchdowns on offense and 107 tackles and three sacks on defense. He committed to the University of Washington to play college football.

College career
After redshirting his first year at Washington in 2017, Otton played in all 14 games with 10 starts in 2018. He finished the year with 13 receptions for 174 yards and three touchdowns. As a sophomore in 2019, he started all 13 games, recording 32 receptions for 344 yards and two touchdowns. As a junior in 2020, he started all four games and had 18 receptions for 258 yards and three touchdowns. Otton returned to Washington for his senior year in 2021 rather than enter the 2021 NFL Draft.

Professional career

Otton was drafted by the Tampa Bay Buccaneers in the fourth round, 106th overall, of the 2022 NFL Draft.

In Week 9, Otton caught the game-winning touchdown from Tom Brady in a 16–13 victory over the Los Angeles Rams.

References

External links
 Tampa Bay Buccaneers
Washington Huskies bio

Living people
People from Tumwater, Washington
Players of American football from Washington (state)
Sportspeople from the Seattle metropolitan area
American football tight ends
Washington Huskies football players
1999 births
Tampa Bay Buccaneers players